Take a Daytrip is an American record production and songwriting duo composed of Denzel Baptiste 
(born January 9, 1993) and David Biral (born February 22, 1993). They are best known for producing singles such as Sheck Wes' "Mo Bamba", Lil Nas X's "Panini", "Montero (Call Me by Your Name)",  and "Industry Baby" (featuring Jack Harlow), Juice Wrld's "Legends", and Travis Scott and Kid Cudi's "The Scotts", all of which peaked in the top 30 of the Billboard Hot 100. Most of their songs use their signature producer tag, "Daytrip took it to ten", in the intro.

History 
The duo met while Baptiste and Biral were attending New York University and started producing in 2014. They have produced many hit singles, with their first notable track being "Mo Bamba" by Sheck Wes in 2017, which peaked at number six on the Billboard Hot 100. Their highest-charting singles currently are "The Scotts" by Travis Scott and Kid Cudi and "Montero (Call Me by Your Name)" and "Industry Baby" by Lil Nas X, all of which peaked at number one on the Billboard Hot 100.

Legal issues 
In October 2019, two Atlanta producers, Don Lee and Glen Keith Demeritt III, claimed that the Lil Nas X and Cardi B song "Rodeo" was a copy of the song "Broad Day" by Puerto Reefa and Sakrite Duexe, which they produced. The two sued Lil Nas X, Cardi B, and Take a Daytrip. , the case is ongoing.

Discography

Singles 
 "I Don't Mind"  (2017)
 "Fiji"  (2017)
 "Stressed"  (2019)
 "Louis"  (2019)
 "Lighthouse"  (2019)

Featured singles 
 "Raw Emotions"  (2017)
 "Poison"  (2020)
 "Soda"  (2020)
 "Y Don't U"  (2021)

Production discography

Charted songs

References

External links

American musical duos
American hip hop record producers
Record production duos
American songwriting teams
Hip hop duos